Nathan Katz (24 December 1892, in Waldighofen – 12 January 1981, in Mulhouse) was a Jewish Alsatian poet from the Sundgau region. He wrote in Standard German as well as the Alsatian dialect.

Serving at the East Front during the First World War, he was made prisoner in Nizhny Novgorod, where he wrote Das Galgenstüblein in June 1915.

External links
   Official site of the Nathan Katz Cultural Heritage Prize, created in Strasbourg in 2005
  Literature by and about Nathan Katz, Katalog der Deutschen Nationalbibliothek

1892 births
Alsatian Jews
1981 deaths
French male poets
German male poets
20th-century French poets
20th-century French male writers